The Boston mayoral election of 1864 saw Frederic W. Lincoln Jr. reelected to a sixth overall term.

Results

See also
List of mayors of Boston, Massachusetts

References

Mayoral elections in Boston
Boston
Boston mayoral
19th century in Boston